Matthew George Robert Ridenton (born 11 March 1996) is a New Zealand footballer who plays as a midfielder for Lions FC.

Club career

Ridenton played youth football for Three Kings United and Saint Kentigern College, and made his career debut the age of 18 for ISPS Handa Premiership club Auckland City.

Ridenton signed a professional contract at Hyundai A-League side Wellington Phoenix in 2013. After four seasons of sporadic appearances, he broke out in the 2017–18 A-League season, making 26 appearances as the Phoenix finished ninth.

On 9 May 2018, it was announced that Ridenton would move to 2017–18 A-League runners-up Newcastle Jets on a two-year contract, reuniting with former Wellington Phoenix manager Ernie Merrick.

In January 2020, Ridenton joined EFL Championship club Reading for a week-long trial.
On 6 November 2020 it was announced that Ridenton had returned to the Phoenix, signing a one-year contract with the club. Following the end of the 2020–21 season, Ridenton departed the club.

International career

In May 2014, Ridenton was called into the All Whites squad by interim coach Neil Emblen for a friendly match against South Africa.

Honours

Country
New Zealand
 OFC Nations Cup: 2016

References

External links
 

1996 births
Living people
New Zealand association footballers
Auckland City FC players
Wellington Phoenix FC players
Newcastle Jets FC players
A-League Men players
New Zealand Football Championship players
2016 OFC Nations Cup players
New Zealand international footballers
New Zealand youth international footballers
Association footballers from Auckland
Association football midfielders